Tahis (born 19 May 1988 in Barcelona, Spain) is a Spanish singer.

Musical career

Tahis with fourteen years, is well known for her powerful voice, with great abilities and wide vocal range .

The same year, she won a contest of amateur singers being first with a song by Whitney Houston "Greatest Love Of All."

At the age of sixteen, she is submitted to a casting and Ricardo Cocciante chooses between the two thousand people to do the lead role of Esmeralda in the musical "Notre Dame de Paris". She was the youngest player in a musical in Spain.

Shortly after she debuted as a composer and later recorded ' "Si tienes fe" (Contains making of and videoclip 'Me echaras de menos').

In 2007, he participated in the second Gala Misión Eurovisión'''.

Her first single was 'Me echarás de menos' one of the top ten broadcast stations in Spain and with her second single' Si hay amor' has been released successfully in the environments.

Debut album

At nineteen she published "Si tienes fe", first album, meticulously produced by Jordi Cubino (David Bisbal, 4,000,000 copies, Luis Fonsi, 1,000,000, Estrella Damm, etc. ...) and care in every detail. its presentation, complete booklet inside and added value features hint at its content and style.

Some of the songs are the responsibility of leading composers to performers of international stature, as well as songs by the artist, like the single "Si tienes fe" a song created for the personal growth of each person.

An album produced by musicians of international stature and collaborators Eros Ramazzotti, Laura Pausini ...
Recorded between Barcelona and Milan, mastered at Nautilus by the technician of Sting, Madonna, Tina Turner or Laura Pausini.

The title track adds a bonus DVD including a video clip, photos and a documented Making Off, etc...

Today

Se is currently working on what will be her second album with a great prospect, while collaborating in acts of solidarity through the music, like what happened to Haiti.

DiscographyNotre Dame de París, Spanish version (2001).
"La canción de la Zíngara".
"Ave María Pagana".
"Vivir".Si tienes fe'' (2005).
"Si tienes fe".
"Me echaras de menos".
"Te ofrezco".
"Ni tú ni yo".
"Si hay amor".
"Canción de soledad".
"Un amigo más".
"Cerrando heridas".
"Para siempre".
"Cómplices de amor".
"Si hay amor" (remix).

Singles 
"Me echarás de menos".
"Si hay amor".
"Si tienes fe".

References

External links 

 Página web oficial
 My Space de Tahis
 Web Fantahisia

Living people
Spanish singer-songwriters
Latin pop singers
Singers from Madrid
1988 births
Tahis
Musicians from Barcelona
21st-century Spanish singers
21st-century Spanish women singers